GRO or Gro may refer to:

Organisations
 General Register Office

Technology and science
 Generic receive offload, in computer networking
 GRO structure file format, used by GROMACS
Growth-related oncogene

Transportation
 Girona–Costa Brava Airport (IATA code), Spain
 J. Douglas Galyon Depot (Station code), North Carolina, US
 Rota International Airport (FAA LID code), Northern Mariana Islands

Other uses
 Green River Ordinance (band), an American rock band
 Gro (given name)
 Gró, a figure in Norse mythology
 Groma language (ISO 639-3 code) - language spoken by some Tibetans

See also
 Compton Gamma Ray Observatory (CGRO)